The 2011–12 Top League was the ninth season of Japan's domestic rugby union competition, the Top League. The Suntory Sungoliath team defeated Sanyo Wild Knights by 47–28 in the final of the Microsoft Cup to claim their second Top League championship.

The Top League is a semi-professional competition which is at the top of the national league system in Japan, with promotion and relegation between the next level down.

Teams

Regular season

Table

Fixtures and results

Round 1

Title play-offs
Top 4 sides of the regular season competed in the Microsoft Cup (2012) knock-out tournament to fight for the Top League title. The top 4 teams of 2011–12 were Suntory Sungoliath, Toshiba Brave Lupus, Sanyo Wild Knights, and NEC Green Rockets.

Semi-finals

Final

Wildcard play-offs

The Top League teams ranked 5th and 8th played-off, and the teams ranked 6th and 7th played-off, with the winners qualifying for the All-Japan Rugby Football Championship.

So Kobe and Yamaha progressed to the All-Japan Rugby Football Championship.

Top League Challenge Series

Canon Eagles and Kyuden Voltex won promotion to the 2012–13 Top League via the 2011–12 Top League Challenge Series, while Kubota Spears and Toyota Industries Shuttles progressed to the promotion play-offs.

Promotion and relegation play-offs
Two promotion/relegation matches (Irekaesen) were played. The Top League teams ranked 12th and 11th played-off against the Challenge 1 teams ranked 3rd and 4th respectively, for the right to be included in the Top League for the following season.

So Sanix and NTT Docomo remained in the Top League for the following season.

End-of-season awards

2012/2013 Team of the Season

References

External links
2011–12 Top League Fixtures

Japan top league
TOp
2011-12